Djordje Djikanovic (born 18 August 1984) is a Montenegrin retired footballer who last played as a defender for Hajer Club in the Saudi Professional League.

References

1984 births
Living people
Footballers from Nikšić
Association football defenders
Serbia and Montenegro footballers
Montenegrin footballers
FK Čelik Nikšić players
FK Sutjeska Nikšić players
OFK Grbalj players
FK Budućnost Podgorica players
Muaither SC players
FK Kukësi players
Hajer FC players
Second League of Serbia and Montenegro players
Montenegrin First League players
Qatar Stars League players
Kategoria Superiore players
Saudi Professional League players
Expatriate footballers in Qatar
Montenegrin expatriate sportspeople in Qatar
Expatriate footballers in Albania
Montenegrin expatriate sportspeople in Albania
Expatriate footballers in Saudi Arabia
Montenegrin expatriate sportspeople in Saudi Arabia